International Business Machines Corporation v. Commission (1981) Case 60/81 is an EU law case, concerning judicial review in the European Union.

Facts
The Commission sent a letter to IBM that it was bringing proceedings for abusing a dominant position, under EU competition law, inviting it to put a case. IBM sought to challenge the letter in judicial review proceedings, and the question was whether the letter was a reviewable act.

Judgment
The Court of Justice held this letter was not a reviewable act, just a preliminary decision.

See also

European Union law

Notes

References

Court of Justice of the European Union case law